The Bratislava International Film Festival (also known as Bratislava IFF) is an international film festival established in 1999 and held annually in Bratislava, Slovakia.

Apart from the international competition programme, it also regularly features renowned authors' film retrospectives, a European film program, independent film programmes and various theme programmes.

Awards
Awards are presented in the following categories:

Grand Prix for best film in the international competition
Best Director
Best Actress
Best Actor
FIPRESCI Award for best film, as determined by a jury of film critics

Award winners

Grand Prix

2003 IFF Bratislava
Grand Prix - Bored in Brno (directed by Vladimír Morávek, Czech Republic)
Best Director - Li Yang (Blind Shaft, China)
Best Actress - Kateřina Holánová (Bored in Brno, Czech Republic)
Best Actor - Maruf Pulodzoda (Angel on the Right, Tajikistan)
FIPRESCI Award - The Island (directed by Constanza Quatriglio, Italy)

2004 IFF Bratislava
Grand Prix - Or (My Treasure) (directed by Keren Yedaya, Israel)
Best Director - Atiq Rahimi (Earth and Ashes, Afghanistan)
Best Actress - Lindsay Duncan and Paula Sage (AfterLife, United Kingdom)
Best Actor - Pietro Sibille (Days of Santiago, Peru)
FIPRESCI Award - Private Madness (directed by Joachim Lafosse, Belgium)

2005 IFF Bratislava
Grand Prix - The Cave of the Yellow Dog (directed by Byambasuren Davaa, Mongolia)
Best Director - George Clooney (Good Night, and Good Luck., United States)
Best Actress - Stephanie James (A Way of Life, United Kingdom)
Best Actor - Pavel Liška (Something Like Happiness, Czech Republic)
FIPRESCI Award - Everything Is Illuminated (directed by Liev Schreiber, United States)

2006 IFF Bratislava
Grand Prix - 4:30 (directed by Royston Tan, Singapore)
Best Director - Amat Escalante (Blood, Mexico)
Best Actress - Hermila Guedes (Suely in the Sky, Brazil)
Best Actor - Antoni Pawlicki (Retrieval, Poland)
FIPRESCI Award - Retrieval (directed by Slawomir Fabicki, Poland)

2007 IFF Bratislava
Grand Prix - Blind Mountain (directed by Li Yang, China)
Best Director - Veiko Õunpuu (The Autumn Ball, Estonia)
Best Actress - Julie Kolbeck (The Art of Crying, Denmark)
Best Actor - Sam Riley (Control, United Kingdom)
FIPRESCI Award - Tricks (directed by Andrzej Jakimowski, Poland)

2008 IFF Bratislava
Grand Prix - Mid-August Lunch (directed by Gianni Di Gregorio, Italy)
Best Director - Amat Escalante (The Bastards, Mexico, France, United States)
Best Actress - Nada Abou Farhat (Under the Bombs, Lebanon, France, United Kingdom, Belgium)
Best Actor - Zsolt Anger (The Investigator, Hungary, Sweden, Ireland)
FIPRESCI Award - Under the Bombs (directed by Philippe Aractingi, Lebanon, France, United Kingdom, Belgium)

2009 IFF Bratislava
Grand Prix - The Day God Walked Away (directed by Philippe Van Leeuw, Belgium, France)
Best Director - Kamen Kalev (Eastern Plays, Bulgaria, Sweden)
Best Actress - Ruth Nirere (The Day God Walked Away, France, Belgium)
Best Actor - Christo Christov (Eastern Plays, Bulgaria, Sweden)- Ex-aequo / Post-mortem 
Best Actor - Harold Torres (Northless, Mexico, Spain)- Ex-aequo
FIPRESCI Award - Northless (directed by Rigoberto Perezcano, Mexico, Spain)
Special mention - Northless (directed by Rigoberto Perezcano, Mexico, Spain)
Ecumenical Jury Award - Kamen Kalev (Eastern Plays, Bulgaria, Sweden)
Ecumenical Jury Award special mention - Optical Illusions (directed by Cristian Jiménez, Chile, France)
Student Jury Award - Whisper With the Wind (directed by Shahram Alidi, Iraq)
Best Documentary Film - Petition (directed by  Zhao Liang, France, China)
Best Short Film - Rita (directed by  Zhao Liang, Italy)
Shorts Jury special mention - A Man Overboard (directed by Fabien Gorgeart, France)
Shorts Jury special mention - Party (directed by Dalibor Matanić, Croatia)
The IFF Bratislava Award for Artistic Excellence in World Cinematography - Juraj Herz (director)

2010 IFF Bratislava
Grand Prix - The Four Times (directed by Michelangelo Frammartino, Italy, Germany, Switzerland)
Best Director 
 Dragomir Sholev (Shelter, Bulgaria)
 Constantine Popescu (Portrait of the Fighter As A Young Man)
 Best Actress - Charlotte Gainsbourg (The Tree, France, Australia)
 Best Actor - Robert Naylor (10½, Canada)

2011 IFF Bratislava
Grand Prix - Las Acacias (directed by Pablo Giorgelli, Argentina, Spain)
Best Director - Vincent Garenq (Guilty, France) 
 Best Actress - Iben Hjejle (Stockholm East, Sweden)
 Best Actor - Ivan Trojan (Visible World, Czech Republic)

References

External links

Bratislava IFF official website
IFF Bratislava at IMDb

Film festivals in Slovakia
Film festivals established in 1999
Culture in Bratislava
Tourist attractions in Bratislava
1999 establishments in Slovakia